The House of Cabrera was an important Catalan dynasty. It began to rule in the Viscounty of Girona, which would be called Viscounty of Cabrera, as well as the Viscounty of Àger, the Sicilian County of Modica and the County of Urgell.

Origin 
The dynasty has its origins in the Castle of Cabrera (Castell de Cabrera) at L'Esquirol, a village included now in the municipality of Santa Maria de Corcó, in the natural comarca known as Cabrerès, Osona. The first documented ruler is Gausfred de Cabrera in 1002. His son Guerau I de Cabrera married Ermessenda de Montsoriu, daughter of the Viscount of  Girona Amat de Montsoriu. In this manner the lineage of Cabrera went on to rule the Viscounty of Girona, formerly known as Viscounty of Montsoriu.

Viscounts of the House of Cabrera 
 1002-1017: Gausfred de Cabrera 
 1017-1050: Guerau I de Cabrera 
 1050-1105: Ponç I de Cabrera 
 1105-1132: Guerau II de Cabrera 
 1132-1162: Ponç II de Cabrera 
 1162-1180: Guerau III de Cabrera 
 1180-1199: Ponç III de Cabrera 
 1199-1229: Guerau IV de Cabrera 
 1229-1242: Guerau V de Cabrera 
 1242-1278: Guerau VI de Cabrera 
 1278-1328: Marquesa de Cabrera 
 1328-1332: Bernat I de Cabrera 
 1332-1343: Bernat II de Cabrera 
 1343-1349: Ponç IV de Cabrera 
 1349-1350: Bernat II de Cabrera
 1350-1358: Bernat III de Cabrera 
 1373-1423: Bernat IV de Cabrera 
 1423-1466: Bernat V de Cabrera 
 1466-1474: Joan I de Cabrera 
 1474-1477: Joan II de Cabrera 
 1477-1526: Anna I de Cabrera 
....
 Enríquez de Cabrera nephew of the former
 Luis Enríquez de Cabrera

See also
Viscounty of Cabrera
County of Urgell
List of European Jewish nobility

External links

 Enciclopèdia Catalana: Cabrera
 Enciclopèdia Catalana: Cabrera Viscounts

Medieval Catalonia
Catalan nobility